Sergiu Matei (born April 23, 1992 in Chișinău), also known professionally as OT BEATZ, is a Moldovan professional footballer who currently plays for FC Petrocub Hîncești in the Moldovan National Division and music producer

Professional career 
Sergiu Matei is the disciple of the Zimbru Chisinau Academy and made his debut in the professional football for the first team of Zimbru Chisinau in Moldova National Division against FC Tiraspol at the age of 17, in October 2009.

Between 2012 and 2015 Sergiu Matei played for the U-21 team of Moldova, he is second most capped U-21 player after Artur Patras.

Music career 
Sergiu Matei is also a music producer, beatmaker, and DJ known as OT BEATZ. He is known for producing songs for artists like Tory Lanez, Oxxxymiron, Nafe Smallz, MARKUL, Porchy, L'One, ST, Prince Ea, The Motans and other minor worldwide artists.

He also released himself as an artist in 2014 with his first single track "BLVCK", later he releases his second single "Hey World" featuring Mikaella (now Misha Miller).The single is released with an official music video which features the official drummer of the Russian band "Amatory" Daniil [STEWART] Svetlov with a drum part on the drop.

Honours

Club

FC Veris 

 Moldovan "A" Division

Winner: 2012–13

 Moldovan Cup

Runner-up: 2012–13

FC Spicul Chișcăreni 

 Moldovan "A" Division

Third Place: 2016–17

FC Floresti 

 Moldovan "A" Division

Runner-up: 2018

FC Petrocub Hîncești 

 Moldovan National Division

Third Place: 2018

References

External links
 
 
 Sergiu Matei at FoxSports.com
 
 

Living people
1992 births
Moldovan footballers
Association football midfielders
Moldovan record producers
Hip hop record producers
Moldovan Super Liga players
FC Zimbru Chișinău players
FC Sfîntul Gheorghe players
FC Veris Chișinău players
FC Speranța Crihana Veche players
FC Academia Chișinău players
FC Spicul Chișcăreni players
FC Florești players
CS Petrocub Hîncești players